The Perfect Husband may refer to:

The Perfect Husband (2003 film), an Indian romantic comedy film
The Perfect Husband (2014 film), an Italian horror film
The Perfect Husband: The Laci Peterson Story, a 2004 American television film